Bastendorf is a small town in the commune of Tandel, in north-eastern Luxembourg.  , the town has a population of 371.

Bastendorf was a commune in the canton of Diekirch until 1 January 2006, when it was merged with the commune of Fouhren to form the new commune of Tandel, in Vianden.  The law creating Tandel was passed on 21 December 2004.

Former commune
The former commune consisted of the villages:

 Bastendorf
 Brandenbourg
 Landscheid
 Tandel
 Hoscheidterhof
 Këppenhaff
 Fischbacherhof (lieu-dit)
 Froehnerhof (lieu-dit)
 Ronnenbusch (lieu-dit)

Footnotes

Tandel
Former communes of Luxembourg
Towns in Luxembourg